Peters Canyon Wash is a tributary of San Diego Creek in central Orange County in the U.S. state of California. The largest tributary of Peters Canyon is the Santa Ana Channel (not to be confused with the Santa Ana-Delhi Channel, which flows directly into Upper Newport Bay.)

See also
List of rivers of Orange County, California

References

Orange County, California articles needing infoboxes
Rivers of Orange County, California
Rivers of Southern California